Bonnie J. Morris (born May 14, 1961; Los Angeles, California) is an American scholar of women's studies. She completed a PhD in women's history at Binghamton University in 1989 and has taught at various universities including Georgetown University, George Washington University, and University of California, Berkeley.

Morris has published research on various subjects, including the feminist movement, women in Chabad Judaism, the history of women's music, and lesbian erasure. In 2017, her archival collection of the women's music movement was exhibited at the Library of Congress, where Morris also presented the lecture "The Sounds of Feminist Revolution". She is a three-time Lambda Literary Award finalist (Eden Built By Eves: The Culture of Women's Music Festivals, Girl Reel, Revenge of the Women's Studies Professor), and winner of two national first-prize chapbooks (The Schoolgirl's Atlas, Sixes and Sevens).

Works

Scholarly

Other books
 
 
 
 
 
 Morris, Bonnie J. (2014). Sixes and Sevens.

Miscellaneous
 Soundwaves of Feminism: The Women's Music Movement (Library of Congress, 2017)

See also
 List of feminists

References

External links
 
  Bonnie J. Morris at C-SPAN
 Lecturer: Bonnie Morris, Semester at Sea, Institute for Shipboard Education
  Bonnie J. Morris at National Women's History Museum

Living people
1961 births
20th-century American women writers
21st-century American women writers
American feminist writers
American lesbian writers
American women academics
American women historians
Feminist studies scholars
Feminist theorists
Lesbian academics
Lesbian feminists
American women dramatists and playwrights
Historians from California
Writers from California
Writers from North Carolina
American University alumni
Binghamton University alumni
George Washington University faculty
Georgetown University faculty
Harvard Divinity School faculty
University of California, Berkeley faculty